Alburnus macedonicus is a species of ray-finned fish in the genus Alburnus. It is endemic to Doiran Lake in Greece and North Macedonia.

References

macedonicus
Fish described in 1928
Taxa named by Stanko Karaman